Tattyreagh St Patrick's is a GAA club based in the townland of Tattyreagh (from the ), about halfway between Omagh and Fintona in County Tyrone, Northern Ireland.

History
A training pitch was built with flood lights. A new stand was built in 2015 and named after a former club member of the club.

Tattyreagh won the 2017 Tyrone Junior Football Championship and proceeded to the Ulster Junior Club Football Championship as representative of County Tyrone. In 2018, Tattyreagh won the Tyrone Intermediate Championship. The Omagh Council hosted a reception for the club in February 2019.

Achievements
 Tyrone Intermediate Football Championship 
 2018
 Tyrone Junior Football Championship
 2017

References

Website
 St Patrick's Tattyreagh GAA

Gaelic games clubs in County Tyrone
Gaelic football clubs in County Tyrone